The Avignonet massacre occurred on the eve of 28 May 1242 when a small force, mainly consisting of Cathars, massacred a group of inquisitors during the Albigensian Crusade.

Background
Guillaume Arnaud and Etienne de Saint-Thibery, the chief inquisitors of the County of Toulouse were visiting Avignonet. Arnaud and Saint-Thibery were lodged at the castle of Raymond VII, Count of Toulouse. The count's nephew, Raymond d'Alfaro sent a letter to Montsegur, where there were a number of prominent Cathars, including Pierre Roger.
The letter informed Pierre Roger that the inquisitors were in Avignonet.

The trip to Avignonet
Pierre Roger set out for Avignonet with about 15 knights and 40 horse riding sergeants, which was about half of his Montsegur garrison. Pierre Roger stopped at the town of Gaja-la-Selve, taking up a reserve position while the others continued.

The attack on the castle and subsequent massacre
By nightfall, the raiders had arrived at Avignonet. A messenger continued to give them information about the activities of the inquisitors. Sympathetic locals opened the gates for the raiders and twelve knights and fifteen locals marched toward the castle. The raiders broke down the castle door and hacked the inquisitors to death. Eleven men died. The castle was then looted.

Aftermath
Eventually, the French government decided to crack down on the Cathars, resulting in the Siege of Montségur from 1243 to 1244.

References

1242 in Europe
Massacres in France
Albigensian Crusade
History of Haute-Garonne